Cormocephalus hartmeyeri is a species of centipede in the Scolopendridae family. It is endemic to Australia, and was first described in 1908 by German naturalist Karl Kraepelin.

Distribution
The species is found in the Western Plateau region of Western Australia.

Behaviour
The centipedes are solitary terrestrial predators that inhabit plant litter, soil and rotting wood.

References

 

 
hartmeyeri
Centipedes of Australia
Endemic fauna of Australia
Fauna of Western Australia
Animals described in 1908
Taxa named by Karl Kraepelin